Virginia's 43rd House of Delegates district elects one of 100 seats in the Virginia House of Delegates, the lower house of the state's bicameral legislature. District 43 represents part of Fairfax County. The seat is currently held by Democrat Mark Sickles.

Geography
District 43, representing part of Fairfax County, is located in Virginia's 8th Congressional District.

References

Government in Fairfax County, Virginia
Virginia House of Delegates districts